The National Cricket Stadium can refer to:

 National Cricket Stadium (Grenada)
 National Cricket Stadium, Tangier
 Sher-e-Bangla National Cricket Stadium